Higher National Veterinary School (ENSV, Arabic:), is a public institution of higher learning founded in Algeria in 1970, by Presidential Decree No. 65-69 of March 11, 1965. It is located in Hacène Badi - El Harrach 12 km east of Algiers.

External links
 (fr) Site of the Higher National Veterinary School

1970 establishments in Algeria
Educational institutions established in 1970
Universities and colleges in Algeria
Buildings and structures in Algiers
Education in Algiers
Veterinary schools in Algeria